Jelena Peeters (born 19 December 1985, Turnhout) is a Belgian speed skater. She was born in Turnhout. She competed at the 2014 Winter Olympics in Sochi, where she placed 12th in 3000 meters and 20th in 1500 meters.

Peeters is the current Belgian record holder in three distances: 1500, 3000 and 5000 metres.

Speed skating

Personal records

References 

1985 births
Living people
Belgian female speed skaters
Speed skaters at the 2014 Winter Olympics
Speed skaters at the 2018 Winter Olympics
Olympic speed skaters of Belgium
Sportspeople from Turnhout
21st-century Belgian women